Anupam Shahjahan Joy is a Bangladesh Awami League politician and the former Member of Parliament from Tangail-8.

Career
Joy was elected to parliament from Tangail-8 by-elections on 29 March 2015 as a candidate of Bangladesh Awami League.

References

Awami League politicians
Living people
10th Jatiya Sangsad members
Year of birth missing (living people)